Germanium chloride may refer to:
 Germanium dichloride, germanium(II) chloride, GeCl2
 Germanium tetrachloride, germanium(IV) chloride, GeCl4

Germanium compounds